Andre Ricardo Percival (born 5 January 1975) in Guyana) is a Guyanese cricketer.  He has played first-class, List A and Twenty20 cricket for Guyana in a career which spanned from 1992 to 2006.  He captained the West Indies Under-19 cricket team in their 1994/95 series against England Under-19s.

References

External links
Cricinfo article on Andre Percival

1975 births
Living people
Guyanese cricketers
West Indian cricket captains
People from New Amsterdam, Guyana
Guyana cricketers